Bailén-Miraflores, also known as District 4, is one of the 11 districts of the city of Málaga, Spain.

It comprises the following wards (barrios):
Arroyo del Cuarto
Arroyo de los Ángeles
Camino de Suárez
Carlinda
Carlos Haya
Florisol
Gamarra
Granja Suárez
Haza del Campillo
Industrial San Alberto
La Alcubilla
La Bresca
La Corta
La Encarnación
La Florida
La Trinidad
Las Chapas
Los Castillejos
Los Millones
Miraflores de los Ángeles
Nueva Málaga
Parque del Norte
Parque Victoria Eugenia
Pavero
San Alberto
San Martín
Suárez
Tejar de Salyt
Victoria Eugenia

References

External links

Málaga Council official website
Aerial pictures of Bailén-Miraflores district

Districts of Málaga